The Ladies Professional Golf Association (LPGA) is an American organization for female golfers. The organization is headquartered at the LPGA International in Daytona Beach, Florida, and is best known for running the LPGA Tour, a series of weekly golf tournaments for elite female professional golfers from around the world.

Organization and history
Other "LPGAs" exist in other countries, each with a geographical designation in its name, but the U.S. organization is the first, largest, and best known. The LPGA is also an organization for female club and teaching professionals. This is different from the PGA Tour, which runs the main professional tours in the U.S. and, since 1968, has been independent of the club and teaching professionals' organization, the PGA of America.

The LPGA also administers an annual qualifying school similar to that conducted by the PGA Tour. Depending on a golfer's finish in the final qualifying tournament, she may receive full or partial playing privileges on the LPGA Tour. In addition to the main LPGA Tour, the LPGA also owns and operates the Epson Tour, formerly the Futures Tour, the official developmental tour of the LPGA. Top finishers at the end of each season on that tour receive playing privileges on the main LPGA Tour for the following year.

The LPGA is the oldest continuing women's professional sports organization in the United States. It succeeded the WPGA (Women's Professional Golf Association), which was founded in 1944 but stopped its limited tour after the 1948 season and officially ceased operations in December 1949. The WPGA was founded by Ellen Griffin, Betty Hicks, and Hope Seignious.

The LPGA was founded in 1950 at Rolling Hills Country Club in Wichita, Kansas. Its 13 founders were: Alice Bauer, Patty Berg, Bettye Danoff, Helen Dettweiler, Marlene Hagge, Helen Hicks, Opal Hill, Betty Jameson, Sally Sessions, Marilynn Smith, Shirley Spork, Louise Suggs, and Babe Zaharias. Patty Berg was its first president. The founders were elected to the World Golf Hall of Fame as a group in 2023 though six had already been inducted individually.

The first LPGA tournament was the 1950 Tampa Women's Open, held at Palma Ceia Golf and Country Club in Tampa, Florida. Ironically, the winner was amateur Polly Riley, who beat the stellar field of professional founders.

In 1956, the LPGA hosted its first tournament outside the United States at the Havana Open in Havana, Cuba.

In 1996, Muffin Spencer-Devlin became the first LPGA player to come out as gay.

In 2001, Jane Blalock's JBC Marketing established the Women's Senior Golf Tour, now called the Legends Tour, for women professionals aged 45 and older. This is affiliated with the LPGA, but is not owned by the LPGA.

Since 2006, the LPGA has played a season-ending championship tournament.

Michael Whan became the eighth commissioner of the LPGA in October 2009, succeeding the ousted Carolyn Bivens. Whan is a former marketing executive in the sporting goods industry.

After a lawsuit filed by golfer Lana Lawless, the rules were changed in 2010 to allow transgender competitors. In 2013, trans woman Bobbi Lancaster faced local scorn for attempting playing in Arizona's Cactus Tour and attempting to qualify in the LPGA Qualifying Tournament.

In 2018, the LPGA acquired an amateur golf association, the Executive Women's Golf Association (EWGA), and expanded its emphasis to include amateur golfers in the U.S. and North America. Initially called the LPGA Women Who Play, the amateur organization was rebranded as the LPGA Amateur Golf Association. The LPGA Amateur Golf Association has member-operated chapters throughout North America and the Caribbean.

Prize money and tournaments
In 2010, total official prize money on the LPGA Tour was $41.4 million, a decrease of over $6 million from 2009. In 2010 there were 24 official tournaments, down from 28 in 2009 and 34 in 2008. Despite the loss in total tournaments, the number of tournaments hosted outside of the United States in 2010 stayed the same, as all four lost tournaments had been hosted in the United States. By 2016, the number of tournaments had risen to 33 with a record-high total prize money in excess of $63 million. In 2019, a new record was set with total prize money amounting to $70.5 million (a rise of over $5 million in one year).

International presence
In its first four decades, the LPGA Tour was dominated by American players. Sandra Post of Canada became the first player living outside the United States to gain an LPGA tour card in 1968. The non-U.S. contingent is now very large. The last time an American player topped the money list was in 2014 (Stacy Lewis), the last time an American led the tour in tournaments won was in 2020 (Danielle Kang), and from 2000 through 2009, non-Americans won 31 of 40 major championships.

Particularly, one of the notable trends seen in the early 21st century in the LPGA is the rise and dominance of Korean golfers. Se Ri Pak's early success in the LPGA sparked the boom in Korean women golfers on the LPGA Tour. In 2009, there were 122 non-Americans from 27 countries on the tour, including 47 from South Korea, 14 from Sweden, 10 from Australia, eight from the United Kingdom (four from England, three from Scotland and one from Wales), seven from Canada, five from Taiwan, and four from Japan.

LPGA Tour tournaments

As a United States-based tour, most of the LPGA Tour's events are held in the United States. In 1956, the LPGA hosted its first tournament outside the United States at the Havana Open in Havana, Cuba. In 2020, fourteen tournaments are held outside of the United States, seven events in Asia, four in Europe, two events in Australia, and one in Canada.

Five of the tournaments held outside North America are co-sanctioned with other professional tours. The Ladies European Tour co-sanctions the Women's British Open, The Evian Championship in France, and the Women's Australian Open (also co-sanctioned with the ALPG Tour).  The other two co-sanctioned events—the BMW Ladies Championship (LPGA of Korea Tour) and Toto Japan Classic (LPGA of Japan Tour)—are held during the tour's autumn swing to Asia.

LPGA majors
The LPGA's annual major championships are:
Chevron Championship
U.S. Women's Open
Women's PGA Championship
Women's British Open
The Evian Championship

LPGA Playoffs
Since 2006, the LPGA has played a season-ending championship tournament. Through the 2008 season, it was known as the LPGA Playoffs at The ADT; in 2009 and 2010, it was known as the LPGA Tour Championship; and in 2011, the event became the CME Group Titleholders, held in November.

From 2006 through 2008 the LPGA schedule was divided into two halves, with 15 players from each half qualifying for the Championship based on their performance. Two wild-card selections were also included for a final field of 21 players. The winner of the LPGA Tour Championship, which features three days of "playoffs" plus the final championship round, earns $1 million.

In 2009, the Tour Championship field was increased to 120 players, with entry open to all Tour members in the top 120 on the money list as of three weeks prior to the start of the tournament. The total purse was $1.5 million with $225,000 going to the winner.

The CME Group Titleholders, which resurrects the name of a former LPGA major championship (the Titleholders Championship), was first played in 2011. From 2011 to 2013, its field was made up of three qualifiers from each official tour event during the season, specifically the top three finishers not previously qualified. Beginning in 2014, the field will be determined by a season-long points race. The winner of the points race will receive a $1 million bonus.

2023 LPGA Tour

Historical tour schedules and results

Official tournaments are tournaments in which earnings and scores are credited to the players' official LPGA record.

Hall of Fame
The LPGA established the Hall of Fame of Women's Golf in 1951, with four charter members: Patty Berg, Betty Jameson, Louise Suggs, and Babe Zaharias. After being inactive for several years, the Hall of Fame moved in 1967 to its first physical premises, in Augusta, Georgia, and was renamed the LPGA Tour Hall of Fame. In 1998 it merged into the World Golf Hall of Fame.

LPGA Tour awards
The LPGA Tour presents several annual awards. Three are awarded in competitive contests, based on scoring over the course of the year. 
The Player of the Year is awarded based on a formula in which points are awarded for top-10 finishes and are doubled at the LPGA's five major championships, and the season-ending CME Group Tour Championship. The points system is: 30 points for first; 12 points for second; nine points for third; seven points for fourth; six points for fifth; five points for sixth; four points for seventh; three points for eighth; two points for ninth and one point for 10th.
The Vare Trophy, named for Glenna Collett-Vare, is given to the player with the lowest scoring average for the season.
The Louise Suggs Rookie of the Year Award is awarded to the first-year player on the LPGA Tour who scores the highest in a points competition in which points are awarded based on a player's finish in an event. The points system is: 150 points for first; 80 points for second; 75 points for third; 70 points for fourth; and 65 points for fifth. After fifth place, points are awarded in decrements of three, beginning at sixth place with 62 points. Points are doubled in the major events and at the season-ending Tour Championship. Rookies who make the cut in an event and finish below 41st each receive five points. The award is named after Louise Suggs, one of the founders of the LPGA.

American golfer Nancy Lopez, in 1978, is the only player to win all three awards in the same season. Lopez was also the Tour's top money earner that season.

Leading money winners by year

1 The five players with three titles in 1988 were Juli Inkster, Rosie Jones, Betsy King, Nancy Lopez, and Ayako Okamoto.

Leading career money winners
The table below shows the top-10 career money leaders on the LPGA Tour (from the start of their rookie seasons) as of March 5, 2023.

Active players on the Tour are shown in bold.

Total prize money awarded in past years

See also
Golf in the United States
List of golfers with most LPGA Tour wins
List of LPGA major championship winning golfers
Professional Golfers' Association of America
Professional golf tours
Women's World Golf Rankings

References

External links

Tournaments
Facebook

 
Golf in the United States
Sports professional associations based in the United States
Professional associations for women
Women's golf
Golf governing bodies
+
Sports organizations established in 1950
Women's sports organizations in the United States
1950 establishments in the United States